is a movie released by Malice Mizer on March 22, 2002. It is a silent film with a storyline similar to Dracula and other vampire-based stories with Japanese and English captions for dialogue. Malice Mizer's final album, Bara no Seidou, along with the song "~Zenchou~" from the album Voyage ~Sans Retour~, the previous to be released on the Midi:Nette, serves as the background score. Some of the tracks had been altered slightly to fit the pace of the movie and the scene. Many parts of the story (especially in the beginning) are flashbacks.

Cast
 Klaha – The protagonist, a man who travels to Transylvania on business.
 Közi – A Byronic vampire who helps Klaha to confront Yu~ki.
 Mana – A female vampire and nun who is working for the Earl of Dracula. It is revealed in a flashback that she's also a witch who was set to be burned alive, but was saved.
 Yu~ki – The Earl of Dracula, the antagonist of the story.
 Terumi Nagayoshi – Cecil, the protagonist's fiancée.

The reference of the characters
 Klaha – Based upon both Jonathan Harker in Dracula and (as revealed in the end of the film) Louis de Pointe du Lac in The Vampire Chronicles.
 Közi – Based upon Lestat de Lioncourt in The Vampire Chronicles.
 Mana – Based upon both Renfield in Dracula and Armand in The Vampire Chronicles.
 Yu~ki – Based upon Count Dracula in Dracula.
 Terumi Nagayoshi (Cecil) – Based upon Mina Murray in Dracula.

Synopsis
Klaha and Cecil are set to get married. However, their wedding must be postponed because Klaha is summoned from England to Romania on business. Klaha goes to Transylvania, and arrives at the Earl of Dracula's castle, where he is staying. The Earl seems welcoming, but Klaha has strange experiences while staying there. On his arrival, he notices a painting of the Earl's deceased wife, who looks very much like Cecil. 2 nights later, the Earl agrees to buy a house in England. That same night, after having a nightmare, Klaha wakes up to see a coffin leaving the grounds. While looking for the Earl, Klaha sees the painting again, but this time, the word "Cecil" is written under it. Too late does Klaha realise that the Earl is a vampire. He immediately leaves to try to catch up with him.

Meanwhile, back in London, Cecil starts having dreams about the Earl of Dracula. She confesses those dreams to Mana, disguised as a nun, who tells her to pray about it. During Klaha's stay, she, unaware that Klaha is already going back, receives a letter (seemingly in Klaha's hand, but probably written by the Earl) informing her that Klaha must stay an additional night, thus upsetting her. On the night that Klaha is returning, Közi visits Cecil to drink her blood (as he had done with other victims; a move that he regrets). The Earl, however, sees this occur, and sends Mana to stop him. After a confrontation in which she uses roses as knives, Közi demands to know why she is attacking him; Mana tells him that Cecil is "the Earl's Virgin Bride." At hearing this, Közi realises that the Earl wants to remain immortal. After a flashback which reveals their pasts (see above), Közi calls Mana a hypocrite, since she sold her soul for revenge. Mana responds, "I believe in God so I can keep my self-respect!"; hearing this, Közi leaves in anger.

Several nights later, the Earl's coffin arrives at the Church. The Earl wakes up, and Mana brings him a girl (not Cecil). He bites the girl's neck, and immediately, he gains his youthful appearance back. He then proceeds to kill the deliverymen who brought him in. The next day, he darkens the day sky and meets Cecil, who he immediately recognises by her respective locket (which has a photo of Klaha); he reappears during that moment to give her locket back to her. That same evening, the Earl finally visits Cecil. After several moments, the Earl bites down her neck. Two nights later, she finally realises that Klaha was on his way back, and attempts suicide, but is saved by the Earl.

Klaha finally returns to England. Upon his return, he discovers that Cecil is ill, and her parents don't know what to do. Klaha then sees the two bite marks on Cecil's neck and informs everyone, "A vampire did this"; he then shows his two bite marks. Klaha realises that he is once again too late to stop the Earl, and says, "Now I'll really need help!" while a vision of the Earl holding the town in terror appears. The scene shifts back to the beginning of the film proper: Klaha, Cecil's father, a priest, and a doctor attempt to exorcise Cecil in an attempt to lure out the Earl. Suddenly, the Earl of Dracula appears. Klaha attempts to shoot the Earl through the neck, but he immediately recovers. He sets Cecil free. The priest attempts to stop him, but the Earl manages to throw the priest's crucifix on the ground. He then kills the priest by breaking his neck, stabs Cecil's father, and slits the doctor's throat. Klaha makes one last attempt to stop the Earl and Cecil from escaping, but they escape anyway (whereas, in the beginning, which was shown as a dream, he stabs Cecil when she became a human shield).  Közi then appears in the room. Klaha is frightened at first, but Közi assures him that he will not harm him, revealing where they are hidden: underneath the church. Közi tells Klaha he must kill Dracula and Mana, the latter because of one reason, as Közi explains: "The more an adept believer of God you are, the more horrible the experience will be," reminding Klaha of the death of the priest. Before they leave, Közi reminds Klaha: "Don't forget to kill him!", which Klaha promises to do.

They go to the church, where a ritual is under way to make Cecil the Earl's wife. Klaha appears in an attempt to stop the Earl and Mana. He draws his gun, only to see the Earl attempt to bite his neck to kill him. Közi, however, comes at the nick of time, and he and the Earl start to fight (the reason for the fight was, as explained by Közi, because of territorial issues). During the fight, Mana attempts to escape, but is found out by the Earl, and is used by him as a human shield, protecting him from a blow that was meant for him. The ferocity of the Earl's attacks increase as a result from this. Közi, however, instead of continuing the fight, surprises everyone by stabbing himself in the gut. Közi asks Klaha to kill him, and he does.

Klaha then goes to Cecil. At first, she seems to have recovered. However, her eyes turn red and she bares her fangs at him, proving she is still a vampire. Mana tells Klaha to kill Cecil before dying herself, begging him to "Please stop [Cecil's] breath." Klaha attempts to do so, only to be prevented by the Earl, who, although injured, is still alive. Cecil drinks his blood again (the first was earlier, during the ritual). While this goes on, Klaha takes advantage and stabs the Earl 2 times with his sword, outraging Cecil. Klaha then turns his sword to Cecil, and he manages to stab her 3 times. Before going for a fourth, he hesitates and lowers his sword. He then does something familiar: he stabs his hand to allow Cecil to drink his blood. The scene ends with Cecil giving a familiar expression, and it's revealed that Klaha was a vampire all along; he was biting her neck (albeit unseen from the position of their faces).

In the final scene, Klaha, in his vampire form, wakes up, as if from a nightmare, suggesting that perhaps the whole events which occurred in the film were all inside of Klaha's mind. Cecil (also in her vampire form, but dressed in a white wedding gown and with her hair down) sits up beside him and smiles. The film ends with Klaha walking down the aisle, carrying Cecil in his arms. The final intertitle states their feelings for each other: "The only one I want is you."

External links
 

2002 films
Japanese silent films
Japanese vampire films
Malice Mizer
2000s Japanese films